David Milwyn Duggan (May 5, 1879 – May 4, 1942) was a Welsh-born Canadian politician who was the Mayor of Edmonton from 1920 to 1923, a member of the Legislative Assembly of Alberta, and a leader of the Conservative Party of Alberta.

Early life

David Duggan was born in Builth, Wales May 5, 1879.  In 1893 he entered the dry goods business, in which he remained until leaving Wales.  In 1902 he married Marian Price; the pair had four children.

Duggan immigrated to Canada in 1905 to farm near Nanton, Alberta.  he and his brother Joseph J. moved to Edmonton in 1912 and founded Duggan Investments, Ltd., a firm handling bonds and investments. (Joseph served as Edmonton city councillor 1924 to 1925.)

Municipal politics

Duggan ran for mayor in the 1920 Edmonton election when, despite lacking any previous experience, he defeated incumbent Joseph Clarke.  Clarke had become unpopular with the city's Board of Trade and both of its newspapers owing to what they perceived as anti-business policies, and these groups supported Duggan aggressively.  While Duggan was mayor, Alberta's first radio station, CJCA, began operations, and Duggan himself concluded its inaugural broadcast by boasting "Edmonton leads the way in all Alberta. Calgary and others follow. That is all. Goodnight."  He was re-elected in 1921 and 1922, but did not seek re-election after his last term expired.

Provincial politics

His attentions turned to provincial politics, and he was elected to the Legislative Assembly of Alberta in the 1926 election as a Conservative in the riding of Edmonton.  Duggan succeeded Alexander McGillivray as leader in 1930, and led the party into that year's election.  In this election, the Conservatives picked up a seat in Edmonton (taking three of the city's six seats), but were shut out of seats outside of Edmonton and Calgary, as they had been in 1926.  Moreover, they lost ground to the rival Alberta Liberal Party in the race to form the official opposition to the governing United Farmers of Alberta.  Duggan easily retained his own seat.

The situation worsened for the Conservatives in the 1935 election, when the Social Credit Party of Alberta swept the province, reducing the Conservatives to two members, Duggan and Calgary MLA John Irwin (the other parties fared no better - the Liberals lost six of the eleven seats they had won in 1930, while the UFA, owners of a majority government before the writ was dropped, were eliminated from the legislature completely).  In response to this catastrophe, Duggan's Conservatives formed an alliance with the Liberals, the Unity League, whereby candidates of the parties would not run against each other, these were identified as Independents on election results as the Unity League did not have official party status.  In the 1940 election, there were nineteen independents elected, including Duggan.

During his last full term in the legislature, Duggan was involved in the Bankers' Toadies incident.  He brought to the house's attention a government-sponsored leaflet that named him and eight other men (William Antrobus Griesbach among them) as "Banker's Toadies" and urged readers to "exterminate them".  This incident saw two men, including Social Credit MLA Joseph Unwin, prosecuted for criminal libel and counselling murder.

Personal life, death, and legacy

Duggan was active with the Baptist Church, the Rotary Club, the Edmonton Chamber of Commerce, and the Red Cross.  He died May 4, 1942 while still an MLA. He was buried in Mt. Pleasant Cemetery in Edmonton.

In 2004, Edmonton City Council passed a motion directing its Names Advisory Committee to strike a subcommittee whose purpose would be, among other things, to honour Duggan by naming a city feature after him.

References

External links
Edmonton Public Library Biography of David Duggan
City of Edmonton biography of David Duggan
Edmonton Economic Development Corporation's account of CJCA's first broadcast
History of the "Banker's Toadies" case
Minutes of the Edmonton City Council meeting at which the Names Advisory Committee was directed to honour Duggan

1879 births
1942 deaths
People from Builth Wells
Businesspeople from Edmonton
Progressive Conservative Association of Alberta MLAs
Canadian Baptists
Leaders of the Progressive Conservative Association of Alberta
Mayors of Edmonton
People from Powys
Welsh emigrants to Canada
Welsh politicians
20th-century Canadian politicians